Statistics of Belgian First Division in the 1899–1900 season.

Overview

It was contested by 10 teams, and Racing Club de Bruxelles won the championship.

League standings

Championship Group A

Play-off

Racing Club de Bruxelles Qualified for the National Final.

Championship Group B
Only the rankings are known.

Final

See also
1899–1900 in Belgian football

References

External links
Belgian clubs history

1899
1899–1900 in European association football leagues
1899–1900 in Belgian football